Paulína Bátovská Fialková (born 25 October 1992) is a Slovak biathlete. She competed at the Biathlon World Championships 2012 and 2013, and at the 2014 Winter Olympics in Sochi, and 2018 Winter Olympics. At the 2018 Winter Olympics she finished at the fifth place in the 15 km individual event.

Her younger sister Ivona Fialková also competes for Slovakia in biathlon.

In summer of 2018 she became the world champion in sprint in summer biathlon on world championship in Nové Město na Moravě.

In 2018 she successfully graduated at Faculty of Law of Matej Bel University in Banská Bystrica, Slovakia and she gain Magister degree. Her bachelor thesis was on theme The possession of firearms and ammunition for sporting purposes. She wrote it in 2015. Her diploma thesis was about International Law and Control Mechanisms of Doping in Sport.

She is the winner of prestigious Slovak award Slovenka roka 2019 (Slovak woman of the year 2019) in category sport.

Biathlon results
All results are sourced from the International Biathlon Union.

Olympic Games
0 medals

*The mixed relay was added as an event in 2014.

World Championships
0 medals

*During Olympic seasons competitions are only held for those events not included in the Olympic program.
**The single mixed relay was added as an event in 2019.

World Cup

Overall record

* Results in IBU World Cup races, Olympics and World Championships.

Individual podiums

References

External links

 
 
 
 

1992 births
Living people
Biathletes at the 2014 Winter Olympics
Biathletes at the 2018 Winter Olympics
Biathletes at the 2022 Winter Olympics
Slovak female biathletes
Olympic biathletes of Slovakia
Universiade medalists in biathlon
Sportspeople from Brezno
Universiade gold medalists for Slovakia
Universiade silver medalists for Slovakia
Universiade bronze medalists for Slovakia
Competitors at the 2015 Winter Universiade